Fountaine is a surname. Notable people with the surname include:

Andrew Fountaine (1918–1997), English far-right activist and politician
Andrew Fountaine (art collector) (1676–1753), English antiquarian, art collector and amateur architect
Charles Fountaine (1879–1946), British Royal Navy officer
Jamal Fountaine (born 1971), American football player
John Fountaine (1600–1671), English civil servant and tax resister
Margaret Fountaine (1862–1940), English lepidopterist

See also
Fountain (disambiguation)
Fountaine-Pajot, a French shipbuilding company
Fontaine (disambiguation)

English-language surnames